Alec Campbell (1899–2002) was the final surviving Australian participant of the Gallipoli campaign during the First World War.

Alec Campbell may also refer to:

 Alec Campbell (archaeologist) (born 1932), archaeologist and museum curator in Botswana
 Alec Campbell (footballer) (1890–1943), footballer for Southampton and manager at Chesterfield

See also
 Alexander Campbell (disambiguation)